Julie de Châteaubriant (1668–1723) was a French aristocrat.  

She was the unofficial lover of king Louis XIV of France in 1683. It was a temporary, unofficial sexual affair. According to rumour, the affair was encouraged by her family, who were in disfavour with the king, to benefit them. She has been referred to as the last mistress of the king, who in that same year married Madame de Maintenon.

References

 K. F. Oelke, Louis XIV and the Land of Love and Adventure: 1679 to 1699

1668 births
1723 deaths
Mistresses of Louis XIV